Star Stowe (born Ellen Louise Stowe; March 19, 1956, Little Rock, Arkansas – March 16, 1997, Coral Springs, Florida) was an American model. She was Playboy magazine's Playmate of the Month for its February 1977 issue. Stowe was murdered by an unknown assailant.

Biography
Stowe was born Ellen Louise Stowe on March 19, 1956, in Little Rock, Arkansas and grew up in Arkansas, Louisiana and Nevada. Her father was an engineer. When she was a teenager she moved to Las Vegas and then to Los Angeles, where she worked as a stripper in an adult club.

Stowe chose to call herself "Star" because of her love of the skies and had a blue star tattooed below her bikini line.

She dated Gene Simmons and he sent her photos to Playboy. Her shoot was photographed by Pompeo Posar, and included some pictures with a Rickenbacker bass guitar. The shoot was used as the centerfold in the February 1977 issue, and she was Playmate of the Month.  She was the first playmate with a visible tattoo.

Stowe at one time dated KISS founder and bassist Gene Simmons. As well as taking part in a number of publicity shots for the band, Stowe also appeared on one of the band's picture discs.

Stowe later married and divorced Peter Maligo, with whom she had a son, Michael.  Stowe moved to Fort Lauderdale in 1986 to find work as an exotic dancer. When Michael was six she sent him to live with her mother but still stayed in touch with him through phone calls and visits. The dancing didn't work out. Stowe eventually fell into prostitution, alcoholism and drug abuse.

In 1991, Stowe moved in with a boyfriend and gave up drugs and prostitution. This lasted until August 1996, when after a drunken argument they split. Stowe went back to her former life on the streets.

Murder
Stowe was last seen working the streets in her old neighborhood between 3pm and 5pm on March 16, 1997. Her body was later found strangled and partially clothed. It was three days before her 41st birthday. Police believe that she was picked up, killed and then dumped sometime after 5pm on the 16th.

Police linked the murder to that of Sandra Kay Walters, a prostitute who had been strangled in Fort Lauderdale a few weeks earlier on February 25. When Tammy Strunk was found murdered in November 1997 police believed the deaths might be the work of a serial killer. This theory was strengthened when several other prostitutes in the area were subsequently strangled and dumped in a similar manner. Her murder remains unsolved.

See also
List of people in Playboy 1970–1979
List of unsolved murders

References

1956 births
1970s Playboy Playmates
1997 deaths
1997 murders in the United States
20th-century American people
20th-century American women
People from Little Rock, Arkansas
American murder victims
American prostitutes
Deaths by strangulation in the United States
Female murder victims
Sex workers murdered in the United States
Unsolved murders in the United States
Victims of serial killers
People murdered in Florida
American female erotic dancers
1997 in Florida